Captree is a census-designated place (CDP) in the towns of Islip and Babylon in Suffolk County, New York, United States. It occupies Captree Island in Great South Bay, as well as the east end of Jones Beach Island to the south, comprising Captree State Park. It was first listed as a CDP prior to the 2020 census. Prior to that it was part of the Oak Beach–Captree CDP.

The community is in southwestern Suffolk County, on two islands that lie between Long Island to the north and Fire Island to the south. The eastern two-thirds of the CDP are in the town of Islip, while the one-third of the CDP that occupies the portion of Captree Island west of the Robert Moses Causeway is in the town of Babylon. The Robert Moses Causeway connects Captree and Jones Beach islands with West Islip,  to the north on Long Island. Ocean Parkway runs west from Captree through Oak Beach and Gilgo, leading  to Jones Beach State Park. To the south, the Fire Island Inlet Bridge leads  to Robert Moses State Park on Fire Island.

Demographics

References 

Census-designated places in Suffolk County, New York
Census-designated places in New York (state)